Dhalai Bridge (Briji)  is a neighbourhood located in Garia, Kolkata, India. It is surrounded by Baishnabghata Patuli to the north, New Garia and Garia railway station to the east, Garia Bazar to the west and Kamalgazi to the south.

See relevant
List of Kolkata Metro stations

References

Neighbourhoods in Kolkata